A dryad is a tree nymph or tree spirit in Greek mythology. Drys (δρῦς) signifies "oak" in Greek. Dryads were originally considered the nymphs of oak trees specifically, but the term has evolved towards tree nymphs in general, or human-tree hybrids in fantasy. Often their life force was connected to the tree in which they resided and they were usually found in sacred groves of the gods. They were considered to be very shy creatures except around the goddess Artemis, who was known to be a friend to most nymphs.

Types

Daphnaie

These were nymphs of the laurel trees.

Epimelides

The Maliades, Meliades or Epimelides were nymphs of apple and other fruit trees and the protectors of sheep. The Greek word melas, from which their name derives, means both apple and sheep. Hesperides, the guardians of the golden apples were regarded as this type of dryad.

Hamadryad

Dryads, like all nymphs, were supernaturally long-lived and tied to their homes, but some were a step beyond most nymphs. These were the hamadryads who were an integral part of their trees, such that if the tree died, the hamadryad associated with it also died. For these reasons, dryads and the Greek gods punished any mortal who harmed trees without first propitiating the tree-nymphs. (associated with Oak trees)

Meliae

The dryads of the ash tree were called the Meliae. The Meliae sisters tended the infant Zeus in Rhea's Cretan cave. Gaea gave birth to the Meliae after being made fertile by the blood of castrated Uranus. The Caryatids were associated with walnut trees.

Names
Some of the individual dryads or hamadryads are:

Atlanteia and Phoebe, two of the many wives or concubines of Danaus
Chrysopeleia
Dryope
Erato
Eurydice
Tithorea

In popular culture 

 Dryad's saddle (Cerioporus squamosus) is a mushroom found in North America, Australia, Asia, and Europe on dead trees, logs and stumps, so named because dryads could conceivably use them as a seat.
 In western classics such as Milton's Paradise Lost, Dryads are mentioned as a way to convey grace and elegance. 
 Keats addresses the nightingale as "light-winged Dryad of the trees", in his "Ode to a Nightingale" . 
 In the poetry of Donald Davidson they illustrate the themes of tradition and the importance of the past to the present. 
 The poet Sylvia Plath uses them to symbolise nature in her poetry in "On the Difficulty of Conjuring up a Dryad" and "On the Plethora of Dryads". 
 The story "Dear Dryad" (1924) by Oliver Onions features a dryad influencing several romantic couples through history.
 In Lev Grossman's The Magicians Trilogy, the character Julia  becomes a dryad after having had her shade removed during her rape at the hands of Reynard the Fox. Her transformation accelerates when she visits Fillory in the company of the novel's other principals, and is complete when she and Quentin Coldwater visit Fillory's underworld.
 The fantasy novels of Thomas Burnett Swann frequently feature dryads, along with other mythological creatures, usually endangered by the advent of more "advanced" civilisations. Swann's story "The Dryad-tree" is set in contemporary Florida and features a woman's reaction to the knowledge that her new husband's garden contains a tree possessed by a jealous dryad. The story was adapted as a short film in 2017.
Dryad Lake in Antarctica is named after the nymphs.

See also
Oreads, a related mountain nymph
Ghillie Dhu, a similar Scottish spirit
Kodama, a similar Japanese spirit
Green spirit, a similar spirit found in Myanmar and other Buddhist countries
Elf, a similar mythical creature associated with nature
Querquetulanae, Roman nymphs of the oak
Rådande, a similar Swedish spirit
Salabhanjika, a similar Indian spirit

References
Citations

Bibliography

Burkert, Walter, 1985. Greek Religion (Cambridge: Harvard University Press).

External links

 Greek Mythology Link: Nymphs.
 Hans Christian Andersen, "The Dryad", 1868 (e-text)
 Andersen, H. C.; Craigie (transl.) "The Dryad" Fairy tales and other stories London; Toronto: Oxford University Press. 1914
 Tim Hoke, "The Dryad", 2002 (e-text; strong language)

 
Nymphs